Sami Subait Al-Hassawi (born 31 July 1992), commonly known as Sami Subait, is an Omani footballer who plays as a goalkeeper .

Personal
His father, Subait bin Awad, was a footballer who represented the Oman national team in the seventies. He moved to Qatar in 2003 and he currently works as a coach in Aspire Academy.

Honours

Club
With Qatar
QNB Cup (1): 2014

References

External links

Sami Al-Hassawi - GOALZZ.com
Sami Al-Hassawi - KOOORA.com

1992 births
Living people
People from Muscat, Oman
Omani footballers
Omani expatriate footballers
Association football goalkeepers
Expatriate footballers in Qatar
Omani expatriate sportspeople in Qatar
Aspire Academy (Qatar) players
Qatar SC players
Al Sadd SC players
Umm Salal SC players
Qatar Stars League players
Qatari Second Division players